Sergiu Diaconu (born 16 February 1978) is a former Moldovan footballer.

Career
He played in many clubs of Moldova such as Zimbru, Olimpia, Happy End, Polytechnic, Rapid, Iskra-Stal, Veris. Also played in Kazakhstan for FC Vostok, Energetik (Pavlodar) and Spartak.
In Russia, he was in the teams "Rotor" and "SKA-Energia", but did not participate in the championship matches. Only in 2003, he took part in the Premier League Cup matches, in which he played for Rotor in all 4 matches (he missed five goals).

Achievements

Team
 Two-time winner of the Moldavian Championship: 1998/1999, 1999/2000.
 Winner of Division “A” of Moldova: 2012/2013.

Family
Married. Has three children.

References

External links

Living people
1978 births
Moldovan footballers
Association football goalkeepers
FC SKA-Khabarovsk players
Expatriate footballers in Russia
Expatriate footballers in Kazakhstan
FC Zimbru Chișinău players
CSF Bălți players
FC Rotor Volgograd players
FC Vostok players
FC Ekibastuz players
CS Petrocub Hîncești players
FC Rapid Ghidighici players
FC Iskra-Stal players
FC Spartak Semey players
FC Veris Chișinău players